The 2018 WeatherTech Raceway California 8 Hours was the second edition of the WeatherTech Raceway California 8 Hours race held on WeatherTech Raceway Laguna Seca on 28 October 2018. The race was contested with GT3-spec cars, GT Cup-spec cars, GT4-spec cars, MARC cars and TCR-touring cars. The race was organized by the Stéphane Ratel Organisation (SRO).

The second annual California 8 Hours is the fourth and final round of the 2018 Intercontinental GT Challenge.

Entries

Official results
Bold denotes category winner.  Results validated on 26 June 2019 following an FIA-related hearing.

NOTE:  The No. 42 Strakka Racing Mercedes-AMG GT that had finished eighth overall, and first in GT3 Pro-Am, was disqualified under after driver Nick Leventis was found in violation of FIA doping regulations.  Leventis' urine sample was taken to the Sports Medicine Research & Testing Laboratory at the University of Utah in Salt Lake City, Utah, where it tested positive for anastrozole (an exogenous aromatase inhibitor, prohibited under S4.1 of the FIA Anti-Doping Code), drostanolone and related metabolite 2α-methyl-5α-androstan-3α-ol-17-one, which are exogenous anabolic 3 androgenic steroids, prohibited under S1.1.a of the FIA Anti-Doping Code).  The results were altered on 26 June 2019 after an official report of the positive test.

References

Motorsport competitions in California
California
California